Adam Steven Ficek (born 8 March 1974) is an English musician and psychotherapist who performs under the Roses Kings Castles name. He is a songwriter and member of Babyshambles.

Ficek joined Babyshambles in 2005 with former The White Sport bandmate Patrick Walden. Prior to 2005, Ficek had recorded with the Mains Ignition, The White Sport, and has also recorded two jazz albums.

Roses Kings Castles
Adam Ficek's side project, Roses Kings Castles (RKC), began while on tour with Babyshambles.

It was initially set up as a formal creative feed for Babyshambles and as a platform on which to build and air his own musical ideas. "It's an outlet for putting stuff out, just demos that I've been working on", states Ficek.

After releasing songs on the internet via his Myspace, Ficek released his first single "Sparkling Bootz" in April 2008. His debut album Roses Kings Castles, was released on 22 September 2008.

Ficek charts the highs and the lows of self-releasing his album through the medium of his blog, where he gives an insight into the music industry.

The first RKC tour took place in January 2009 in 19 venues across the United Kingdom with a European tour soon after.

January 2009 saw the release of a limited edition cassette featuring new demos which were later rerecorded for Suburban Timebomb.

In August 2009, Roses Kings Castles released the EP Apples and Engines.

The second full length Roses Kings Castles album Suburban Time Bomb was released in December 2010. The release was backed by a full band tour of the UK, Europe and South East Asia.

In 2011 Roses Kings Castles became RKC and released a free single "Here comes the summer". On 31 October RKC released the album "British Plastic."  It contained 11 tracks (all written by Ficek).  Ficek played all instruments except for guitar which was played by ex-White Sport and Ex Babyshambles member Patrick Walden.

Discography
Mains Ignition – Turn on (Tummy Touch) – 2002
The White Sport – Songs the Postman can whistle (High Society) – 2004
Babyshambles – Down in Albion (rough trade) 2005
Babyshambles – The Blinding (EMI) – 2006
Babyshambles – Shotters Nation (EMI) – 2007
Peter Doherty – Grace Wasteland (EMI) – 2008

RKC
Roses Kings Castles – Roses Kings Castles (The Sycamore club) – 2008
Roses Kings Castles – Ltd edition cassette EP – 2009
Roses Kings Castles – Apples & Engines EP – 2009
Roses Kings Castles – Suburban Time Bomb – 2010
RKC – British Plastic – 2011

Adam Ficek
'EP 1'  2017

References

External links

 

Living people
1974 births
English rock drummers
British male drummers
English male singers
English songwriters
English rock guitarists
English male guitarists
Alumni of Middlesex University
People from Bletchley
Musicians from Buckinghamshire
21st-century English singers
21st-century British guitarists
21st-century drummers
21st-century British male singers
Babyshambles members
British male songwriters